Bordley is a surname. Notable people with the surname include:

Bill Bordley (born 1958), American baseball player
John Beale Bordley (1727–1804), American planter and judge
Robbie Bordley (born  1947), American rugby union player